Payments UK was a trade association for financial institutions, technology firms and payment processing companies in the United Kingdom.

It merged with a number of other British financial organisations in July 2017 to form UK Finance.

History
On 29 June 2015, Payments UK was launched as the successor to the Payments Council.
The regulatory powers of its predecessor were transferred to the Payment Systems Regulator; it acts primarily as an industry body.

In November 2015 it was confirmed that Payments UK would be merged with the British Bankers' Association, the Council of Mortgage Lenders, the UK Cards Association and the Asset Based Finance Association, following a review into financial trade bodies. The resulting organisation, UK Finance, began operating in July 2017.

Governance
Payments UK is governed by a board of directors representing a cross section of Payments UK's membership, including payment institutions, banks, technology firms and retailers.

The independent chairman of its Board is Gerard Lemos CMG, and its chief executive is Maurice Cleaves. Lemos and Cleaves previously held the same positions in the Payments Council.

See also
UK Payments Administration

References

External links 
Payments UK
Pay Your Way, Payments UK's consumer campaign

Financial services companies established in 2015
Retail financial services
Payment systems organizations
Financial services in the United Kingdom
Organizations established in 2015
Banking in the United Kingdom
British companies established in 2015